Maryland Route 562 (MD 562) is a state highway in the U.S. state of Maryland.  The state highway runs  from Markoe Road north to MD 138 near Monkton in northeastern Baltimore County.  MD 562 was constructed in the early 1930s.

Route description

MD 562 begins as Old York Road at its intersection with Markoe Road.  Old York Road continues south as a county highway to MD 145 in Jacksonville.  The two-lane undivided state highway heads north through farmland.  MD 562 veers northwest onto Troyer Road as Old York Road continues north as a county highway toward MD 23 in Shawsville.  The state highway reaches its terminus at a T-intersection with MD 138, which continues north as Troyer Road and heads west as Sheppards Road to the hamlet of Monkton.

History
Old York Road was an alternate, less-direct route for traffic between Towson and Maryland Line compared to York Road, which is now MD 45.  MD 562 is part of one extant stretch of the road; another segment is MD 439 from Shawsville to Maryland Line.  The Troyer Road section of MD 562 was constructed as a concrete road in 1933.  The Old York Road segment of MD 562 was built as a macadam road in 1934.  The state highway has changed very little since the 1930s.

Junction list

See also

References

External links

MDRoads: MD 562

562
Maryland Route 562